Jody Thomas is a Canadian public servant who has been the national security advisor to the prime minister of Canada since 2022. Thomas has held a number of roles in the Public Service of Canada.

Education 
Thomas holds a Bachelor of Commerce from the University of Calgary and a Bachelor of Arts from Carleton University.

Career 
She has previously served as deputy minister for the Department of National Defence, commissioner of the Canadian Coast Guard, and chief operating officer for Passport Canada, and served as an officer in the Naval Reserve.

Thomas has been described as a realist on global issues, and "hawkish" towards China.

References 

National security in Canada
Canadian civil servants
University of Calgary alumni
Carleton University alumni
Year of birth missing (living people)
Living people